Christoph Brandner (born 5 July 1975) is an Austrian former professional ice hockey winger.

Brandner had the most goals while playing for Krefeld Pinguine team of the German DEL. He was drafted by the Minnesota Wild in the eighth round of the 2002 NHL Entry Draft, the 237th overall pick and became first Austrian hockey player to score a goal in the NHL, when he was playing in the 2003–04 season with the Minnesota Wild.  After the NHL Lockout he signed with Södertälje SK of the Swedish Elitserien. He later returned to his longtime original Austrian team, EC KAC, where he was a cult player. Brandner retired on 2 April 2012, and remained with Klagenfurt where he is currently a Developmental Coach.

Career statistics

Regular season and playoffs

International

References

External links

1975 births
Living people
Austrian ice hockey left wingers
Hamburg Freezers players
Houston Aeros (1994–2013) players
EC KAC players
Krefeld Pinguine players
Ice hockey players at the 1998 Winter Olympics
Ice hockey players at the 2002 Winter Olympics
Minnesota Wild draft picks
Minnesota Wild players
Olympic ice hockey players of Austria
People from Bruck an der Mur
Södertälje SK players
Sportspeople from Styria